"Food, Glorious Food", written by Lionel Bart, is the opening song from the 1960s West End and Broadway musical (and 1968 film) Oliver!

Musical theme
The song is sung from the point of view of the children of a workhouse for orphans where they are forced to work to “earn their keep”, and deprived of proper nutrition while the administrators feast on delicacies. The children arrive for breakfast while fantasizing about delicious food such as sausage and mustard, and sweets including jelly and custard. When the workhouse boys arrive at the front of the serving line they receive only tasteless gruel from the staff. The song is intended as a metaphor for keeping hope alive, despite being mistreated.

In popular culture
In the animated film, Ice Age: The Meltdown, a flock of vultures dance while singing a version of the song.
A parody of the song named "Gruesome ol' Gruel" appears in the 2nd season of the 2020  reboot of Animaniacs.

References

1960 songs
Food and drink in popular culture
Songs written by Lionel Bart
Songs from Oliver!
Songs written for animated films